Wayne County is the westernmost county in the U.S. state of West Virginia. As of the 2020 census, the population was 38,982. Its county seat is Wayne. The county was founded in 1842 and named for General "Mad" Anthony Wayne.

Wayne County is part of the Huntington-Ashland, WV-KY-OH Metropolitan Statistical Area.

History
Wayne County, West Virginia was originally Wayne County, Virginia, which was created from part of Cabell County in 1842. The county was named for General "Mad" Anthony Wayne.

Settlement
There was no European settlers in the area that became Wayne County until after 1794, due to the constant threat of Indian attack. The area was made safe for European settlers in 1794 through the defeat of the Shawnee at the Battle of Fallen Timbers by General "Mad" Anthony Wayne.

When the first permanent European settlers came to Wayne County around the year 1800, the area was part of Kanawha County. Most of the original pioneer settlers were self-sufficient farmers. They raised their own food, sheep for wool clothing, and made their buildings, furnishings and tools out of the surrounding forest. A few trading posts provided the manufactured goods the pioneers could not make for themselves. Later, grist mills at Wayne, Dickson, south of East Lynn and at Lavalette ground their corn into meal and their wheat into flour.

On June 20, 1863, at the height of the Civil War, Wayne was one of fifty Virginia counties that were admitted to the Union as the state of West Virginia.  Later that year, the counties were divided into civil townships, with the intention of encouraging local government.  This proved impractical in the heavily rural state, and in 1872 the townships were converted into magisterial districts.  Wayne County was divided into five districts: Butler, Ceredo, Grant, Lincoln, and Union.  A sixth district, Stonewall, was formed from part of Grant District in 1878.  In the 1920s, Westmoreland was created as the county's seventh magisterial district.  Grant District was discontinued between 1960 and 1970, followed by Lincoln in the 1980s.

Geography

Rivers and lakes
 Ohio River
 Big Sandy River
 Twelvepole Creek
 Beech Fork Lake
 East Lynn Lake
 Tug Fork

Major highways
  Interstate 64
  (future)
  (future)
  U.S. Route 52
  U.S. Route 60
  West Virginia Route 37
  West Virginia Route 152
  West Virginia Route 75

Adjacent counties
 Lawrence County, Ohio (north)
 Cabell County (northeast)
 Lincoln County (east)
 Mingo County (southeast)
 Martin County, Kentucky (south)
 Lawrence County, Kentucky (west)
 Boyd County, Kentucky (northwest)

Wayne County is one of three counties (along with Apache County, Arizona and Cook County, Illinois) to border two counties of the same name, neither of which are in the same state as the county itself (Lawrence County, Ohio and Lawrence County, Kentucky).

Demographics

2000 census
As of the census of 2000, there were 42,903 people, 17,239 households, and 12,653 families living in the county. The racial makeup of the county was 98.79% White, 0.13% Black or African American, 0.23% Native Americans, 0.20% Asian, 0.02% Pacific Islander, 0.08% from other races, and 0.56% from two or more races. 0.47% of the population were Hispanic or Latino of any race.

There were 17,239 households, out of which 31.20% had children under the age of 18 living with them, 59.20% were married couples living together, 10.80% had a female householder with no husband present, and 26.60% were non-families. 24.10% of all households were made up of individuals, and 11.10% had someone living alone who was 65 years of age or older. The average household size was 2.48 and the average family size was 2.92.

In the county, the population was spread out, with 23.40% under the age of 18, 8.70% from 18 to 24, 27.70% from 25 to 44, 25.30% from 45 to 64, and 14.90% who were 65 years of age or older. The median age was 38 years. For every 100 females there were 95.80 males.  For every 100 females age 18 and over, there were 91.80 males.

The median income for a household in the county was $27,352, and the median income for a family was $32,458. Males had a median income of $31,554 versus $20,720 for females. The per capita income for the county was $14,906. About 16.20% of families and 19.60% of the population were below the poverty line, including 25.50% of those under age 18 and 15.20% of those age 65 or over.

2010 census
As of the 2010 United States census, there were 42,481 people, 17,347 households, and 12,128 families living in the county. The racial makeup of the county was 98.6% white, 0.3% American Indian, 0.2% black or African American, 0.2% Asian, 0.1% from other races, and 0.8% from two or more races. Those of Hispanic or Latino origin made up 0.5% of the population. In terms of ancestry, 18.1% were Irish, 16.9% were English, 13.0% were American, and 11.8% were German.

Of the 17,347 households, 30.9% had children under the age of 18 living with them, 53.2% were married couples living together, 11.7% had a female householder with no husband present, 30.1% were non-families, and 26.4% of all households were made up of individuals. The average household size was 2.43 and the average family size was 2.92. The median age was 41.3 years.

The median income for a household in the county was $35,079 and the median income for a family was $44,886. Males had a median income of $40,233 versus $25,765 for females. The per capita income for the county was $18,410. About 16.4% of families and 20.2% of the population were below the poverty line, including 23.2% of those under age 18 and 15.0% of those age 65 or over.

Ancestry/Ethnicity
As of 2017 the largest self-identified ancestry groups in Wayne County were:

Politics
Prior to 2000, Wayne County was strongly Democratic in presidential elections, with only four Republican candidates winning the county from 1872 to 1996, all as a part of a national landslide win for the party. Since 2000, the county has swung to becoming strongly Republican similar to the rest of West Virginia, so strongly that Donald Trump won the county in 2016 by a margin of over 50 percent.

Transportation

Rail
 Norfolk Southern Railway's former N&W Kenova District
 CSX Transportation's former C&O Kanawha Sub
 Kanawha River Terminal Railroad

Air
The public Tri-State Airport, the major airport serving the Huntington–Ashland area, is located in Wayne County south of Interstate 64. The airport is accessible from Interstate 64 via Exit 1. Commercial air service is provided by Allegiant Air and American Airlines.

Notable people

 Michael W. Smith - Musician, pastor, actor.
 Don Robinson - Major League baseball pitcher.
 Jeff Baldwin - Major League baseball player.
 Brad D. Smith - President and CEO of Intuit, Inc.
 Bobby Joe Long- Serial Killer who raped and murdered 10 women in Tampa, Florida.
Derrick Evans – was a member of the West Virginia House of Delegates who resigned after participating in an insurrection and coup attempt against the United States on January 6, 2021. He had the shortest tenure in West Virginia history, only serving in office for 39 days.

Communities

Cities
 Huntington (mostly in Cabell County)
 Kenova

Towns
 Ceredo
 Fort Gay
 Wayne (county seat)

Magisterial districts

Current
 Butler
 Ceredo
 Stonewall
 Union
 Westmoreland

Historic
 Grant
 Lincoln

Census-designated place
 Crum
 Lavalette
 Prichard

Unincorporated communities

 Ardel
 Armilda
 Bethesda
 Booton
 Bowen
 Brabant
 Buffalo Creek
 Centerville
 Coleman
 Cove Gap
 Crockett
 Cyrus
 Dickson
 Doane
 Dunlow
 East Lynn
 Echo
 Effie
 Elmwood
 Ferguson
 Fleming
 Genoa
 Gilkerson
 Girard
 Glenhayes
 Grandview Gardens
 Hidden Valley
 Hubbardstown
 Mineral Springs
 Missouri Branch
 Neal
 Nestlow
 Oakview Heights
 Quaker
 Radnor
 Saltpetre
 Shoals
 Sidney
 Stepptown
 Stiltner (defunct)
 Stonecoal
 Sweet Run
 Tripp
 Webb
 Wilsondale
 Winslow

In popular culture
The following books take place in Wayne County:
 Last Train to Dunlow by Kay and Jack Dickinson. .
 On the Trail of the Powhatan Arrow by Kay and Jack Dickinson. .
 Discovering Lavalette by Gina Simmons. .
 Pioneers, Rebels and Wolves by Robert Thompson.
 Climbing Trout's Hill by Robert Thompson.
 East Lynn Booming by Robert Thompson. .
 Images Of East Lynn by Robert Thompson.
 Fear No Man by Robert Thompson.
 Aging Wonders by Robert Thompson.
 Few Among The Mountains by Robert Thompson.
 Crum by Lee Maynard
 "Protectors of the Ohio Valley by Matthew A. Perry

See also
 Beech Fork State Park
 East Lynn Lake
 National Register of Historic Places listings in Wayne County, West Virginia

References

 
West Virginia counties on the Ohio River
Counties of Appalachia
1842 establishments in Virginia